Joseph Pickford (bap. 1734–1782) was an English architect, one of the leading provincial architects in the reign of George III. The house he designed for himself in Derby is now the Pickford's House Museum.

Biography
Pickford was born in Warwickshire in 1734 but he moved as child to London when his father died. Pickford's initial training was undertaken under the stonemason and sculptor Joseph Pickford (his uncle), at his Hyde Park, London premises. Pickford worked with his uncle for about ten years, training first as a mason and then as an architect. Pickford at one time had offices in both London and Derby. The architect moved to Derby in circa 1760, where he was the agent of Foremarke Hall architect David Hiorne of Warwick. He was married to Mary, daughter of Thomas Wilkins who was the principal agent of Wenman Coke of Longford Hall, Derbyshire which Pickford altered around 1762. The house he designed for himself, Number 41 Friar Gate, is now the Pickford's House Museum and also a Grade I listed building.
Pickford worked extensively throughout the Midland counties of England, primarily designing town and country houses in the Palladian style. A significant number of his friends and clients were members of the influential Lunar Society, including the potter Josiah Wedgwood, the painter Joseph Wright of Derby, and the inventors Matthew Boulton and John Whitehurst.

In early 2013 Derby City Council and Derby Civic Society announced they would erect a blue plaque as a memorial on Pickford's House in Derby.

Principal works
St Helen's House, King Street, Derby, Derbyshire (1766–67) for John Gisbourne.
Hams Hall, Coleshill, Warwickshire for CB Adderely (1768, now demolished).
Etruria Hall, Stoke-on-Trent, Staffordshire for Josiah Wedgwood (1768–70, now comprises part of a hotel).
St Mary's Church, Whittall Street, Birmingham (1773-4, demolished 1920s).

Gallery of architectural work

References

Sources
The principal published source for information on Pickford is Edward Saunders, Joseph Pickford of Derby A Georgian Architect (Alan Sutton, 1993)

External link

1734 births
1782 deaths
18th-century English architects
British neoclassical architects
People associated with Derby Museum and Art Gallery